Times Square Station may refer to:

Times Square–42nd Street/Port Authority Bus Terminal station, New York City
Times Square station (Detroit), Michigan, U.S.
Times Square station (Suzhou Rail Transit), Jiangsu, China